Padmaprabha, also known as Padmaprabhu,  was the sixth Jain Tirthankara of the present age (Avsarpini). According to Jain beliefs, he became a siddha - a liberated soul which has destroyed all of its karma.

In the Jain tradition, it is believed that Padmaprabha was born to King Shridhar and Queen Susimadevi in the Ikshvaku dynasty at Kausambi which is in today's Uttar Pradesh, India. Padmaprabha means ‘bright as a red lotus’ in Sanskrit. It is said in Śvetāmbara sources that his mother had a fancy for a couch of red lotuses – padma – while he was in her womb.

His birth date was the twelfth day of the Kartik krishna month of the Indian calendar. On the eleventh day of the dark half of the month of Margashirsh, Bhagwan Padmaprabha, along with other 308 saints was liberated and attained moksha on Sammet Shikhar (mountain).

Previous Births
Maharaja Aparajit ruled over Susima town located in Dhatki realm in Purvavideh region in Vatsa country. He was a simple and religious person. He got detached after listening to the discourse of an Arihant and took diksha from Acharya Pihitashrava. As a result of long spiritual practices, he earned Tirthankar-nama-gotra-karma. Completing his age, he reincarnated as a god in the Graiveyak realm.

Biography as per Jain traditions 
From the realm of gods, the being that was Aparajit descended into the womb of queen Susima, wife of the king of Kaushambi. One day, queen Susima had a desire to sleep on a bed made up of lotus flowers. As this was a desire of a pregnant mother, the gods made arrangements for its fulfillment. On Krishna Dwadashi (twelfth day of the waning fortnight) of the month of Kartik, the queen gave birth to a son. The new born had a soft pink glow like lotus flowers. The king named him as "Padmaprabha" (meaning one with lotus-like glow).

In due course, the prince became young and was married. When his father left for spiritual practices, Padmaprabh ascended the throne. After a long and successful reign, when through his threefold knowledge he knew that the right moment has come, he became an ascetic. After six months of spiritual practices, on the full moon day of the month of Chaitra he attained omniscience under a banyan tree. Propagating right religion for a long time, Bhagavan Padmaprabh wandered around and at last arrived at Sammetshikhar. He attained Nirvana on the eleventh day of the dark half of the month of Margshirsh.

Association
Padmaprabha is associated with Red Lotus emblem, Chatrabha tree, Manovega (Dig.) & Mangupta (Svet.) Yaksha and Syama Achyuta (Svet.) Yakshi.

Famous Temple
 Padampura Jain Temple, Jaipur, Rajasthan
 Mahudi Jain Temple, Gandhinagar, Gujarat

Gallery

See also

 Padampura
 God in Jainism
 Arihant (Jainism)
 Jainism and non-creationism

Notes

References
 
 
 
 

Tirthankaras
Solar dynasty